John Jackson McLaughry (April 8, 1917 – November 28, 2007) was an American football player and coach. He participated in the Mosquito Bowl.

Playing career 
He attended Brown University, graduating in 1940 and earning All-American honors as a player. In 1940, he played one season with the New York Giants. While serving as a Marine in the 6th Division on Guadalcanal he participated in the Mosquito Bowl.

Coaching career 
After serving in the Pacific theater during World War II he returned to football, becoming an assistant coach at the University of Connecticut. He then served as a head coach at Union College (1947–1949), Amherst College (1950–1958), and Brown University (1959–1966). While his career at his first two coaching jobs was highly successful, his time at Brown was considered a disappointment as he posted just one winning season in eight years. After his coaching career he became Director of Summer and Special Projects at Brown University and spent a great deal of his time painting before dying on November 28, 2007.

Personal life
McLaughry was the son of Tuss McLaughry, head football coach at Westminster College (Pennsylvania) from 1915 to 1916, 1918, and 1921, head football coach at Amherst College from 1922 to 1925, head football coach at Brown from 1926 to 1940, and head football coach at Dartmouth College from 1941 to 1942 and 1945 to 1954, interrupted due to service in World War II. McLaughry thus played for his own father while in college. His mother was Florence Marguerite (nee Jackson) McLaughry (1892-1985). He had an older sister, Jeanne Marguerite McLaughry Mahoney (1912-2007) and a younger brother, Robert DeOrmond McLaughry (1921-2016).

On May 22, 1948, in Rotterdam, New York, he married Anne Justine (nee Van Dyck) Salisbury, who had been previously married and had a son, Edwin Bevier Salisbury (1941-2020). He and Anne had three children of their own: Richard Graham McLaughry (b. 1951), David William McLaughry (b. 1954), and Marguerite Justine McLaughry (b. 1956). Anne was the daughter of Louis Bevier Van Dyck Jr. (1889-1934) and his wife, Marguerite Justine (nee Towle, 1890-1980). She was the third of eight children, and a descendant of Louis DuBois and the Hasbrouck family.

Head coaching record

References

Further reading

External links
 

1917 births
2007 deaths
Amherst Mammoths football coaches
Brown Bears football coaches
Brown Bears football players
Dartmouth Big Green football coaches
UConn Huskies football coaches
New York Giants players
Union Dutchmen football coaches
College track and field coaches in the United States
American military personnel of World War II
People from Lawrence County, Pennsylvania
Players of American football from Pennsylvania